Spontaneous combustion or spontaneous ignition is a type of combustion which occurs by self-heating (increase in temperature due to exothermic internal reactions), followed by thermal runaway (self heating which rapidly accelerates to high temperatures) and finally, autoignition.

Cause and ignition 
Spontaneous combustion can occur when a substance with a relatively low ignition temperature (hay, straw, peat, etc.) begins to release heat. This may occur in several ways, either by oxidation in the presence of moisture and air, or bacterial fermentation, which generates heat. The heat is unable to escape (hay, straw, peat, etc. are good thermal insulators), and the temperature of the material rises. The temperature of the material rises above its ignition point (even though much of the bacteria are destroyed by ignition temperatures). Combustion begins if sufficient oxidizer, such as oxygen, and fuel are present to maintain the reaction into thermal runaway.

Thermal runaway can occur when the amount of heat produced is greater than the rate at which the heat is lost, so materials that produce a lot of heat may combust in relatively small volumes, while materials that produce very little heat may only become dangerous when well insulated or stored in huge volumes. Most oxidation reactions accelerate at higher temperatures, so a pile of material that would have been safe at a low ambient temperature may spontaneously combust during hotter weather.

Affected materials

Confirmed
Haypiles and compost piles may self-ignite because of heat produced by bacterial fermentation. Rags soaked with drying oils or varnish can oxidise rapidly due to the large surface area, and even a small pile can produce enough heat to ignite under the right conditions. Coal can ignite spontaneously when exposed to oxygen, which causes it to react and heat up when there is insufficient ventilation for cooling. Pyrite oxidation is often the cause of coal's spontaneous ignition in old mine tailings. Pistachio nuts are highly flammable when stored in large quantities, and are prone to self-heating and spontaneous combustion. Large manure piles can spontaneously combust during conditions of extreme heat. Cotton and linen can ignite when they come into contact with polyunsaturated vegetable oils (linseed, massage oils); bacteria slowly decompose the materials, producing heat. If these materials are stored in a way so the heat cannot escape, the heat buildup increases the rate of decomposition and thus the rate of heat buildup increases. Once ignition temperature is reached, combustion occurs with oxidizers present (oxygen). Nitrate film, when improperly stored, can deteriorate into an extremely flammable condition and combust. The 1937 Fox vault fire was caused by spontaneously combusting nitrate film.

Hay
Hay is one of the most widely studied materials in spontaneous combustion. It is very difficult to establish a unified theory of what occurs in hay self-heating because of the variation in the types of grass used in hay preparation, and the different locations where it is grown. It is anticipated that dangerous heating will occur in hay that contains more than 25% moisture. The largest number of fires occur within two to six weeks of storage, with the majority occurring in the fourth or fifth week.

The process may begin with microbiological activity (bacteria or mold), but at some point the process has to become chemical. Microbiological activity will also limit the amount of oxygen available in the hay. Moisture appears to be quite important, no matter what process. At 100 °C, wet hay absorbed twice the amount of oxygen of dry hay. There has been conjecture that the complex carbohydrates present in hay break down to simpler sugars, which are more readily oxidized.

Charcoal
Charcoal, when freshly prepared, can self-heat and catch fire. This is separate from hot spots which may have developed from the preparation of charcoal. Charcoal that has been exposed to air for a period of eight days is not considered to be hazardous. There are many factors involved, among them the type of wood and the temperature at which the charcoal was prepared.

Coal
Self-heating in coal has been extensively studied. The tendency to self-heat decreases with the increasing rank of the coal. Lignite coals are more active than bituminous coals, which are more active than anthracite coals. Freshly mined coal consumes oxygen more rapidly than weathered coal, and freshly mined coal self-heats to a greater extent than weathered coal. The presence of water vapor may also be important, as the rate of heat generation accompanying the absorption of water in dry coal from saturated air can be an order of magnitude or more than the same amount of dry air.

Cotton
Cotton too can be a problem. A striking example of a cargo igniting spontaneously occurred on the ship  in the Indian Ocean on 24 August 1834.

Oil seeds and oil-seed products
Oil seeds and residue from oil extraction will self-heat if too moist. Typically, storage at 9–14% moisture is satisfactory, but limits are established for each individual variety of oil seed. In the presence of excess moisture that is just below the level required for germinating seed, the activity of mold fungi is a likely candidate for generating heat. This has been established for flax and sunflower seeds, as well as soy beans. Many of the oil seeds generate oils that are self-heating. Palm kernels, rapeseed, and cotton seed have also been studied. Rags soaked in linseed oil can spontaneously ignite if improperly stored or discarded.

Human

There have been unconfirmed anecdotal reports of people spontaneously combusting. This alleged phenomenon is not considered true spontaneous combustion, as supposed cases have been largely attributed to the wick effect, whereby an external source of fire ignites nearby flammable materials and human fat or other sources.

References

Bibliography

External links 
 Article on the spontaneous combustion of coal 
 Spontaneous combustion demonstration

Combustion